Knapps Brook is a minor tributary of the River Lea in Bedfordshire, England. The source of the river Lea is on Leagrave Common in Luton. It forms from a combination of brooks from East End, Houghton Regis and from the Lewsey Estate near the old Lewsey Farm. It joins the River Lea from culverts under the railway embankment and Toddington Road in Leagrave.

The brook is most easily viewed from footpaths alongside Toddington Road or footpaths running through the nearby Hockwell Ring estate.

Nearby Nappsbury Road in Leagrave takes its name from the former Napps Nursery that occupied the site. The nursery name being a corruption of the brook that runs adjacent to the site.

References

Rivers of Bedfordshire
Tributaries of the River Lea
1Knapps
Luton